Uruguayans in France are people born in Uruguay who emigrated to France.

Overview
French culture has long had a strong influence in Uruguay, with its secondary education and University tailored to the French model. This is a reason why many Uruguayans have found France attractive as a country to pursue higher studies; many of them decided to stay.

During the civic-military dictatorship of Uruguay (1973-1985), some expatriates spent their exile years in France. There are as well a number of French-born people of Uruguayan descent.

Expatriate Uruguayans have their own institutions in France, such as the Consultative Council in Paris.

Notable people

Past
Juan José Calandria (1902-1980), sculptor
Justino Serralta (1919-2011), architect
Héctor Sgarbi (1905-1982), painter
Present
Carlos Curbelo, footballer
Gaston Curbelo, footballer
Elli Medeiros, singer
Luciano Supervielle, musician
Daniel Viglietti, musician

See also
Emigration from Uruguay
France–Uruguay relations
French Uruguayan

References

External links
 Uruguayos en Francia - Consejo Consultivo de París 
 Portal: Uruguayans in France 

Immigration to France by country of origin
Ethnic groups in France
 
France